Wilhelm Brückner (Wilhelm Van Marchena Brückner 11 December 1884 – 18 August 1954) was Adolf Hitler's chief adjutant until October 1940. Thereafter, Brückner joined the Heer (army), becoming an Oberst (colonel) by war's end.

Life
Brückner was born and raised in Baden-Baden. He did his Abitur there. Afterwards he studied law and economics in Strasbourg (then Straßburg, Germany), Freiburg, Heidelberg and Munich. In the First World War, Brückner was an officer in a Bavarian infantry regiment and was discharged as a lieutenant. After the war, he joined the Freikorps Epp and participated in Schützenregiment 42 as a member of the Reichswehr in suppressing the Bavarian Soviet Republic. Towards the end of 1919 Brückner was once again going to university, and worked for three years as a film recording technician. In late 1922 he joined the Nazi Party and the Sturmabteilung (SA). On 1 February 1923, he became leader of the Munich SA Regiment. Brückner was among those who were active in spurring on the Putsch. He warned Adolf Hitler early in November "We have so many unemployed in the ranks, men who have spent their last on uniforms, that the day is not far off when I won't be able to keep a hold on them unless you act. If nothing happens, we will lose control".

Brückner became Hitler's adjutant and one of his bodyguards. At the time there were only five men in the personal squad, including Ulrich Graf, Emil Maurice, Christian Weber, and Julius Schaub. Brückner was "well liked" by the men.

On 9 November 1923, Brückner took part in the Beer Hall Putsch in Munich, and was found guilty of aiding and abetting high treason. On 1 April 1924, he was sentenced to fifteen months' imprisonment. Pretrial confinement time was deducted from his sentence; he, along with Wilhelm Frick and Ernst Röhm walked out of the courtroom as free men on probation. As soon as they had left the room, the newly freed Brückner shouted to his fellow supporters, "It's up to us now!" He once again took over his old SA regiment's leadership. From 1924 to 1928 he worked as the third general secretary at the Association for the German Community Abroad (Verein für Deutsche Kulturbeziehungen im Ausland/VDA). He was employed as a tennis and ski instructor, as well as a sales representative for sporting goods in Munich from 1927 until 1929 when he found work at the German Foreign Institute in Stuttgart.

On 15 August 1933, while driving behind Hitler's car, he lost control of his vehicle and crashed. He suffered a broken leg, fractured skull and an injury to an eye. Fortunately for him, the driver of the car following Brückner was the physician, Karl Brandt. Brandt drove Brückner to a hospital in Traunstein, where he operated on his skull and removed one of his badly injured eyes. Brandt spent the next six weeks at Brückner's bedside until his condition improved. It was through this action that Brandt later became Hitler's escort doctor.

Brückner was appointed Chief Adjutant to Hitler on 20 February 1934, and retained that role until being dismissed on 18 October 1940. In that role he supervised all of the Führer's personal servants, valets, bodyguards, and adjutants. He thereby counted among those who were in Hitler's innermost personal circle, playing as one of Hitler's closest confidants next to Joseph Goebbels and Sepp Dietrich in the propaganda film Hitler über Deutschland (1932). On 9 November 1934, he was appointed an SA-Obergruppenführer by Hitler. 

On 15 January 1936, Brückner became an honorary citizen of Detmold. (He was stripped of this honour by the city council on 9 November 1945.) Brückner, who was well liked by applicants and everyday visitors at the Reich Chancellery for his straightforwardness and affability, lost ever more importance with the war's outbreak. He was replaced in October 1940 by Julius Schaub. Martin Bormann, then chief of staff in the office for Deputy Führer Rudolf Hess was behind Brückner being replaced by Schaub, who was closer to Bormann. Brückner joined the Heer (army), becoming a colonel by war's end. He died on 18 August 1954 in Herbsdorf, Upper Bavaria.

Decorations and awards
Military Merit Cross (Bavaria) 2nd Class with Crown and Swords, 1915
1914 Iron Cross 2nd Class, 1917
1918 Wound Badge in Black, 1918
Honour Chevron for the Old Guard, February 1934
The Honour Cross of the World War 1914/1918 with Swords, 1934
Blood Order #7, 1934
Coburg Badge, 1936
Golden Party Badge, 1938
Anschluss Medal, 1938
Sudetenland Medal, 1939
Memel Medal, 1939
Clasp to the Sudetenland Medal, 1939

Notes

References

External links 

 Wilhelm Brückner at IMDb
 

1884 births
1954 deaths
People from Baden-Baden
German Army personnel of World War I
Nazis who participated in the Beer Hall Putsch
20th-century Freikorps personnel
People from the Grand Duchy of Baden
Sturmabteilung officers
German Army officers of World War II
Adjutants of Adolf Hitler
Members of the Reichstag of Nazi Germany